Alan Khristoforovich Zaseyev (born 16 March 1982 in Beslan) is a former Russian football player.

Zaseyev made a single appearance in the Russian Premier League with FC Alania Vladikavkaz.

He represented Russia at the 1999 UEFA European Under-16 Championship.

External links
 

1982 births
People from Beslan
Living people
Russian footballers
Association football forwards
FC Spartak Vladikavkaz players
Russian Premier League players
Sportspeople from North Ossetia–Alania